Evanina is a genus of moths of the family Noctuidae.

Species
 Evanina wiltshirei (Boursin, 1957)

References
Natural History Museum Lepidoptera genus database
Evanina at funet

Cuculliinae